Ladapeyre is a commune in the Creuse department in the Nouvelle-Aquitaine region in central France.

Geography

Population

Sights
 The church, dating from the thirteenth century.
 The fifteenth-century castle de la Dauge.
 The three manorhouses of Le Coudard, La Chassagne and La Côte.
A large lake, the Etang de Fragne.
 A sixteenth-century stone cross.
 An eighteenth-century public washhouse.

See also
Communes of the Creuse department

References

Communes of Creuse